McCall Family Farmstead is a historic home and farm complex and national historic district located in Bogard Township, Daviess County, Indiana. The house was built about 1883, and is a two-story, frame I-house with a rear ell.  Other contributing resources are a log barn with timber-frame addition (1871, c. 1895), two timber frame barns (c. 1900, 1920), a pump house (c. 1920), garage (c. 1935), five concrete fence posts (1906-1908), and the agricultural landscape.

It was added to the National Register of Historic Places in 2013.

References

Farms on the National Register of Historic Places in Indiana
Historic districts on the National Register of Historic Places in Indiana
Houses completed in 1883
Buildings and structures in Daviess County, Indiana
National Register of Historic Places in Daviess County, Indiana
Houses in Daviess County, Indiana